Allium chloranthum is a species of onion native to Lebanon and southern Turkey.

References

chloranthum
Onions
Flora of Lebanon
Flora of Turkey
Plants described in 1854